San Bartolomé Loxicha  is a town and municipality in Oaxaca in south-western Mexico. The municipality covers an area of 191.4 km2. 
It is part of the Pochutla District in the east of the Costa Region.

As of 2005, the municipality had a total population of 2617.

Mayor Alejandro Hernández Santos was murdered on April 28, 2017.

References

Municipalities of Oaxaca